Gagra District is a district of Abkhazia. It corresponds to the Georgian district by the same name. In medieval times, it was known as the southern part of Sadzen. It is located in the western part of Abkhazia, and the river Psou serves as a border with Krasnodar Krai of Russia. Its capital is Gagra, the town by the same name. The population of the Gagra town zone in 1989 was 77,079, but this number dropped dramatically following the collapse of the Soviet Union and the 1992-1993 war in Abkhazia, (including the ethnic cleansing of Georgians), to 37,002 at the time of the 2003 census. Ethnic Armenians now constitute a plurality in the district.

Administration
Grigori Enik was reappointed as Administration Head on 10 May 2001 following the March 2001 local elections.

In December 2002, Enik was appointed Head of the State Customs Committee, he was succeeded by Valeri Bganba.
On 25 May 2006, Bganba was released from office by President Bagapsh upon his own request, and succeeded by Astamur Ketsba. In turn, after the election of Alexander Ankvab, on 6 September 2011 Ketsba was dismissed upon his own request and temporarily replaced by his deputy Teimuraz Kapba. On 15 November, Grigori Enik, who had previously headed the Presidential Administration, was appointed Acting Head of Gagra District. On 28 May 2012, Enik was permanently appointed.

Following the May 2014 Revolution and the election of Raul Khajimba as President, he dismissed Enik and replaced him with MP Beslan Bartsits (as acting Head) on 22 October. Bartsits was confirmed in his post the following year.

On 16 May 2016, Bartsits became Head of the Presidential Administration. The same day, Gagra Forestry Director Zaur Bganba was appointed acting District Head. Bganba was confirmed in his post on 2 June.

List of governors

Demographics
According to 2003 census, the population of the district included:
Armenians (44.1%)
Abkhaz (27.7%)
Russians (20.0%)
Georgians (3.3%)
Greeks (0.7%)

Settlements
The district's main settlements are:
Gagra
Pitsunda
Leselidze
Gantiadi
Bzyb

The district is mostly mountainous except for the Bzyb lowland in the southern part of it (where Pitsunda is located) and is crossed by several ranges (Gagra, Arabika and others).

See also
Administrative divisions of Abkhazia
Aibgha (village)
Alpuri (village)

Notes

References

 
Districts of Abkhazia